Pomaderris nitidula, commonly known as shining pomaderris, is a species of flowering plant in the family Rhamnaceae and is endemic to eastern Australia. It is a shrub with silky-hairy young stems, elliptic to narrowly elliptic leaves, and cream-coloured flowers .

Description
The flowers are cream-coloured and arranged in small groups in panicles.

Taxonomy
Shining pomaderris was first formally described in 1863 by George Bentham who gave it the name Pomaderris phillyreoidesin var. nitidula in Flora Australiensis.<ref name="APNI1">{{cite web |title=Pomaderris phillyreoidesin var. nitidula |url=https://biodiversity.org.au/nsl/services/rest/instance/apni/112624 |publisher=Australian Plant Name Index |accessdate=16 March 2022}}</ref> In 1951, Norman Arthur Wakefield raised the variety to species status as Pomaderris nitidula. The specific epithet (nitidula) is the diminutive form of the Latin word nitidus, meaning "shining" or "bright", hence "somewhat shining".

Distribution and habitatPomaderris nitidula'' grows in forest, woodland or scrub in rocky places, usually at higher altitudes and occurs in far south-eastern Queensland and as far south as Mount Seaview in New South Wales.

References

Flora of New South Wales
nitidula
Flora of Queensland
Plants described in 1863
Taxa named by George Bentham